Brewer High School is a high school serving 2,162 students in grades 9-12 located in Fort Worth, Texas. It has a notable athletics program, as it has produced major league baseball players Aubrey Huff and Kelly Shoppach. The school mascot is the bear.

History
The old high school was built in the 1950s and was later turned into a middle school in 2008.

Campus
The school's campus on Cherry Lane in White Settlement, Texas was replaced with a new campus located near Loop 820 and Silver Creek Road in Fort Worth in 2007.

Notable alumni

Ron Clark, Former Major League Baseball player
Gene Hatcher, Former boxer
Skyler Howard, Japanese Football Player 
Aubrey Huff, Former Major League Baseball player
Vernon Johnson, NFL Free Agent
Kelly Shoppach, Former Major League Baseball player
Steven  Urquiza, Emperor of Fort Worth

References

External links
Brewer High School
C.F. Brewer High School Exes Association
White Settlement Independent School District
Brewer High School football

Public high schools in Fort Worth, Texas
Public high schools in Tarrant County, Texas